Westfield Football Club is a semi-professional football club based in the Westfield area of Woking, England. The club is affiliated to the Surrey County Football Association.

History
The club was established in 1953 as Westfield Boys Club and started playing in the local Woking and District Football league. During their time in the local leagues, the club won the Surrey Junior Charity Cup and the Surrey Junior Cup. After a few seasons, the club moved up to the Surrey intermediate leagues.

For the 1962–63 season, the club joined the Parthenon League, now under the name of Westfield and finished runners-up at the first attempt. The following season saw the club join the Surrey Senior League. Their ninth season in the Surrey Senior League, 1972–73, saw the club clinch the league title and complete a double success by winning the league cup. Further success followed the next season as they successfully defended the league title. The 1974–75 campaign saw the club make their debut in the FA Vase, where they lost to Chertsey Town, and finished bottom of the league; however, they did not suffer relegation back to the intermediate leagues.

In 1978, the club became a founder member of the Home Counties Football League, which was then renamed the Combined Counties Football League the following season.  The club remained in the Combined Counties Football league for the next twenty-seven seasons, despite finishing in the bottom three times within this period.  They also managed to advance to the Concours Challenge Trophy, but lost out to Hartley Wintney in the final. This period also saw the club enter the FA Cup for the first time when they met Dorking in the extra preliminary qualifying round, but lost 2–1. The 2005–06 campaign saw the club finish in eleventh place, but they were relegated to Division one as their ground did not meet the criteria to remain in the Premier Division.

In 2011–12, the club rewatched its first cup final for in twenty years when they met Warlingham in the Division One Challenge Cup, but lost 4–2. In 2013, the club's youth team was transferred to the Sturridge Football Academy, owned by Daniel Sturridge and operated in part by Leon Sturridge and Cleveland Clarke, which now runs the club's U18 team.

In 2017–18, Tony Reid's side went one better than their runners up position the previous season, after they clinched the Combined Counties Football League title with six games remaining. The Yellows beat local rivals Knaphill 4–1 at Woking Park (12 April 2018) to secure the championship and promotion to step 4 of the National League System for the first time in their history.

2018-19 saw the club finish in 5th place, losing the play-off semi-final to Bracknell Town.

The club remained in contention for promotion to the Isthmian League Premier Division during the 2019–20; however, the season was eventually abandoned due to the coronavirus pandemic, after the UK Government placed all four nations on lockdown from 23 March 2020. This prompted Reid and his assistant Martyn Lee to resign on 15 April 2020, with both seeking new managerial roles within the higher echelons of the non-League football pyramid.

On 16 May 2020, Westfield formally announced the appointment of Simon Lane, who had previously managed at Egham Town, Northwood, Windsor and Eton and Wingate and Finchley. On 9 February 2023, it was announced that Lane had left the Woking Park side to join Kingstonian. 

On 25 February 2023, the club announced it had appointed former Arsenal, Fulham and Woking midfielder Ian Selley.

Ground

Westfield play their home games at Woking Park, Woking, Surrey, GU22 9BA. The ground is located on the north side of Kingfield Road, Woking, on the south side is local non-league rivals Woking F.C. The top of Woking's Leslie Gosden Stand and floodlights at Kingfield Stadium are visible from the balcony at Woking Park.

The Field moved to their current location around 1960, with floodlights being installed in 1998. Major work was undertaken to the ground in the 2010–11 season, which saw the building of a new stand and facilities and the pitch being dug up and raised in May 2011. A new 50 seater stand was constructed in March 2014 at the western end of the football ground to comply with FA Ground Grading requirements (shown in picture to right), this was later expanded to 104 seats in March 2019 following the club's promotion to the Isthmian League.

Staff
President - Richard Hill
Chairman - Steve Perkins
Vice Chairman - Jim Ahmed
Honorary Secretary - Dave Robson
Fixtures Secretary - Darren Pasley
Treasurer - Peter Beale
Bar Manager - Neil Harding
Webmaster - Neil Collins
Programme Editor - Harrison Powell
Commercial Manager - Jim Ahmed
Hospitality Manager - Michael Robson
Facilities Co-ordinator - Jerry Connors
Youth Liaison & Facilities Manager - Pete Rumble
Videographer - Ben Bronx
First Team Manager - Ian Selley
Coach - Dave Powell
Sports Therapist - Princess Goodwin
Kitman - Vacant
Reserve Team Manager - TBC
Reserve Team Coach - TBC
Under 18s Team Manager - Ben Knight

(Last updated: 25 February 2023)

Honours

League honours
Combined Counties Football League:
 Champions (1): 2017–18
 Runners up (1): 2016–17
Surrey Senior League:
 Champions (2): 1972–73, 1973–74
Parthenon League:
 Runners up (1): 1962–63

Cup honours
Combined Counties Football League Premier Cup:
 Winners (1): 2016–17
Surrey Senior League Cup:
 Winners (2): 1971–72, 1972–73
Combined Counties Football League Cup:
 Runners up (1): 1989–90
Combined Counties Football League Division One Challenge Cup:
 Runners up (1): 2011–12
Surrey FA Saturday Premier Cup :
Runners-up (1): 2012–13
Surrey County Junior Cup:
 Winners (1): 1954–55
 Runners up (2): 1955–56, 1957–58
Surrey County Junior Charity Cup:
 Runners up (1): 1954–55

Records
Highest League Position: 1st in Surrey Senior League 1972–73, 1973–74 / Combined Counties Football League 2017–18 
FA Cup best performance: 1st Qualifying Round - 2013-14, 2019-20
FA Vase best performance: Fourth round – 2000–01
Highest Attendance: 325 vs Guernsey 2011–12 Season
Oldest Competitive Player: Roger Steer (1 appearance) 2017–18 Season

Westfield Ladies 

Westfield Football Club had operated a women's football team, Westfield Ladies FC. It had been affiliated to the men's team since forming in 2009 until 2014, and contributes into the club's community development programme.  The Ladies won their respective league in their opening season and played their homes games at Woking Park. However, after only a few seasons the ladies team was dissolved leaving only the senior men's team, the reserve team and the academy (now U18s).

References

External links
Official website

Association football clubs established in 1953
Football clubs in Surrey
1953 establishments in England
Football clubs in England
Parthenon League
Surrey County Intermediate League (Western)
Surrey Senior League
Combined Counties Football League
Isthmian League